The Welch OW-3 was a 2 to 3 seat, light airplane designed by Orin Welch in the late 1920s.

Design
There were two versions of the OW-3. The OW-3 Hi-Lift variant (two built) was a two-seat, open cockpit biplane with a modified Standard J-1 fuselage that incorporated a Welch-designed high-lift wing. The OW-3M (only one built) was an open cockpit parasol monoplane that could seat three people.

Specifications (OW-3 Hi-Lift biplane)

References 

1920s United States civil utility aircraft
Parasol-wing aircraft
Aircraft first flown in 1928
Single-engined tractor aircraft